Julie Alexander (born November 23, 1962) is a current member of the Michigan House of Representatives from the 64th District. The 64th District comprises the City of Jackson, along with the townships of Concord, Hanover, Napoleon, Pulaski, Sandstone, Spring Arbor and Summit.

Biography 
Before serving as a representative, Alexander served as a middle school teacher for nine years and an adult education teacher for thirteen years. Alexander also served three terms on the Jackson County Board of Commissioners.

Alexander and her husband currently operate a third-generation farm in Hanover, Michigan.

Electoral history

References

Living people
Republican Party members of the Michigan House of Representatives
1962 births
21st-century American politicians
21st-century American women politicians
Politicians from Saginaw, Michigan
People from Hanover, Michigan
Women state legislators in Michigan
Western Michigan University alumni